Raja Bendahara (Jawi: راج بنداهارا) is a Malay title of monarch ruler in Pahang Kingdom that existed from 1770 to 1881. The title is a combination of the Sanskrit word Raja ('king') and 'Bendahara' ('grand vizier'). The successive Bendaharas of Johor Empire were ruling Pahang as a fief from the late 17th century. By the end of 18th century, the Bendahara emerged as an absolute ruler over the fief, carrying the title 'Raja', following the decentralisation of Sultan's power and the dismemberment of the empire.

Origin
In classical Malay kingdoms, a Bendahara was the most important and highest administrative position in royal court, serving as the chief of all ministers. As a royal adviser, a Bendahara was appointed by the Raja and dismissible only by the Raja himself. The position is hereditary and candidates were selected from the male descendants of the Bendahara family. 

The ascendancy of a Bendahara into a royalty began in the late 17th century, when the last ruler of Johor from Melaka dynasty, Mahmud Shah II died without a male heir. Tun Abdul Jalil, the Bendahara of Johor, became the next Sultan of Johor, assuming the title Abdul Jalil Shah IV. During his reign, the eastern state of Pahang was established as a special province of the Bendahara family and ruled directly by the successive Bendaharas of the empire. A self-rule was established during the reign of Tun Abdul Majid when the state's status was changed from a tanah pegangan (a fief) to tanah kurnia ('granted land'), thus the ruling Bendahara acquired the title Raja ('king') in Pahang, also known as ''Raja Bendahara'.

List of Raja Bendahara of Pahang

References

Bibliography
 
 
 
Royal titles
Titles
Malay culture